Andrzej Pągowski (born 1953 in Warsaw) is a Polish artist who specializes in graphic design and poster art.

Pągowski graduated from The State University of Fine Arts in Poznan in 1978 and began to design posters, which has since become his main interest. In addition to posters, he designs theatrical settings, prints and catalogues.

One of the younger of the Third Generation of artists of Polish School of Posters, he easily made the transition from socialism to capitalism; in 1990, he created his own graphic studio, STUDIO P, which developed into an advertising agency in 1993 and continues in operation today. In 1992, he had become art director of the Polish edition of Playboy. As an artist, his individualized posters evoke a range of moods and ideas. He claims to have created a separate concept for each of his many posters, saying: “Every poster for me is an individual exercise different from the previous one.” His art can be found in many European museums as well as the Museum of Modern Art in New York,. He has also had one-man shows in Stockholm, Paris, London, and Warsaw.

Major awards
 1978: 3rd Prize, VIII Biennale of Graphic Design, Brno (CS) International Exhibition of Advertising Art & Poster
 1979: Tadeusz Trepkowski Prize, Warsaw
 1980: 3rd Prize, Key Art Award, Posters, The Hollywood Reporter, Los Angeles
 1981: 1st Prize, Key Art Award, Posters, The Hollywood Reporter, Los Angeles
 1981: Tadeusz Trepkowski Prize, Warsaw
 1982: ”Best Poster of the Month”, September (CYRK PC-242), Warsaw's Best Poster Competition
 1983: 2nd Prize, Polish Poster Biennale, Katowice
 1983: "Best Poster of the Year", Warsaw's Best Poster Competition
 1984: 1st Prize, Key Art Award, Posters, The Hollywood Reporter, Los Angeles
 1986: 1st & 3rd Prize, Key Art Award, Posters, The Hollywood Reporter, Los Angeles
 1987: "Best Poster of the Year", Warsaw's Best Poster Competition
 1987: 1st, 2nd & 3rd Prize, Key Art Award, Posters, The Hollywood Reporter, Los Angeles
 1988: 3rd Prize, Key Art Award, Posters, The Hollywood Reporter, Los Angeles
 1989: “City of Posters”, Zacheta Gallery, Warsaw
 1990: 1st Prize, Key Art Award, Posters, The Hollywood Reporter, Los Angeles
 2001: “City of Posters Supplement”, Zacheta Gallery, Warsaw

References

External links
Contemporary Posters - Andrzej Pagowski
Andrzej Pagowski @ Poster.pl

1953 births
Living people
Artists from Warsaw
Polish poster artists